Helladius of Auxerre (died 387) was a Christian bishop of Auxerre. St. Amator (died 418) was ordained deacon and tonsured by Helladius, which provides the earliest example of ecclesiastical tonsure mentioned in the religious history of France. He is commemorated on May 8.

References

Sources
Catholic Encyclopedia, s.v. Diocese of Sens

387 deaths
4th-century bishops in Gaul
4th-century Christian saints
Bishops of Auxerre
Year of birth missing